These are the Canadian number-one country albums of 1979, per the RPM Country Albums chart.

1979
1979 record charts